The Nagcarlan Underground Cemetery is a national historical landmark and museum in Barangay Bambang, Nagcarlan, Laguna supervised by the National Historical Commission of the Philippines. It was built in 1845 under the supervision of Franciscan priest, Fr. Vicente Velloc as a public burial site and its underground crypt exclusively for Spanish friars, prominent town citizens and members of elite Catholic families. It is dubbed as the only underground cemetery in the country.

History

Establishment of the Underground Cemetery 
Fr. Vicente Velloc supervised the establishment of a cemetery in Nagcarlan in 1845 below Mt. San Cristobal. Unlike the traditional Spanish cemeteries at that time, Fr. Velloc decided to build it away from the town's center. The cemetery is planned to serve as a public resting place for the people of the town while the underground chamber below the chapel of the cemetery will only house remains of Spanish friars and prominent people. It was built together with the construction of the expanded St. Bartholomew Parish Church and rectory. The cemetery is built with a chapel where funeral masses were held and directly below it is an underground crypt.

As Meeting Place during the Revolution 
During the Philippine Revolution, the cemetery served as a meeting place of revolutionary leaders of the Katipunan in 1896. Pedro Paterno and Gen. Severino Taiño of the "Maluningning" command held a meeting at the cemetery where they planned the historic Pact of Biak-na-Bato in 1897. It also served as hideout for Filipino leaders during the Philippine–American War and of guerillas in World War II.

Declaration as a Historical Landmark 
The Nagcarlan Underground Cemetery was declared as a National Historical Landmark by virtue of Presidential Decree no. 260, dated August 1, 1973 with amendments by Administrative Order 1505, dated June 11, 1978. Since the declaration, no more burials were allowed in the cemetery. It underwent renovations before it was again opened to the public during the unveiling of the marker on October 24, 1981. The oldest tomb is dated 1886 while the last interment was in 1982 when it was formally declared as a National Historical Landmark.

Features 
The Baroque cemetery is located two kilometers south of downtown Nagcarlan that takes the shape of a circular cemetery across a 1 hectare property. It is surrounded by octagonal stone walls made of red tiles with iron-wrought grills. A façade or arch of about 18 feet high with two iron grill gates leads to a red tiled pathway across a green space leading to the cemetery chapel. The chapel containing a statue of Santo Sepulcro serves as a place for requiem or funeral mass. Located 15 feet below the chapel is an underground graveyard consisting of only 36 tombs arranged in four walls  The crypt and chapel is connected by two flight of steps. The first nine steps lead to a Spanish inscription that reads:

Go forth, Mortal man, full of life Today you visit happily this shelter,But after you have gone out,Remember, you have a resting place here,Prepared for you.

The last six steps lead to the underground crypt.

The cemetery has 240 apartment-type niches on the walls where each side of the chapel contains 120 niches. Overall, there are 276 niches.

Management 
The cemetery complex remained as a property of the Roman Catholic Diocese of San Pablo. It is supervised and managed by the National Historical Commission of the Philippines. Currently, no more burials are allowed inside the cemetery. The complex is used for special celebrations such as the Feast of Christ the King and Lent of the local parish and the diocese.

References

External links 

Cemeteries in the Philippines
Marked Historical Structures of the Philippines
Buildings and structures in Laguna (province)
Tourist attractions in Laguna (province)
Spanish Colonial architecture in the Philippines
National Historical Landmarks of the Philippines